The 29th edition of the annual Décastar took place on 17 September and 18 September 2005 in Talence, France. The track and field competition, featuring a decathlon (men) and a heptathlon (women) event, was part of the 2005 IAAF World Combined Events Challenge.

Men's decathlon

Schedule

17 September

18 September

Results

Women's heptathlon

Schedule

17 September

September 18

Results

See also
2005 World Championships in Athletics – Men's decathlon
2005 Hypo-Meeting
2005 Decathlon Year Ranking
Athletics at the 2005 Summer Universiade – Men's decathlon
2005 World Championships in Athletics – Women's heptathlon

References
 decathlon2000
 IAAF results
 crdp.ac-bordeaux

Décastar
Decastar
Decastar